Brstovec is a settlement in the Municipality of Semič in Slovenia. It lies south of Semič in the historical region of Lower Carniola. The municipality is now included in the Southeast Slovenia Statistical Region.

References

External links
Brstovec at Geopedia

Populated places in the Municipality of Semič